Ariel Belloso (born 14 September 1967) is an Argentine, UK-based DJ and record producer. He began his career playing new wave and disco music at clubs in the city of Rosario during the early 1980s, later in Buenos Aires; and moved to London in 1991, after spending 8 months in Ibiza, where he was influenced by the early house and acid house sounds.

While DJing in London and throughout the world during the 1990s, he developed a personal unique style, combining the sounds of hard house and trance, influenced by the rhythms of his Latin music background with main focus on polyrhythm grooves and energy flow. This sound proved to be an integral and vital element for the evolution of London's hard house and trance scene throughout the early 1990s. He was also the first Argentine artist to enter the UK Singles Chart top 40 with his single, "A9".

Since 2001–2002, Ariel had moved on musically. He abandoned the hard house and trance of the 1990s for a new, Latin-influenced house and techno sound, which he produced and performed through his 7-year weekly residency at London's cutting edge club, Fabric.

History

Early years (1983–1991) 

Ariel was born into a nightclub owning family known as Katanga in the city of Rosario, Argentina. Inspired by his older brother, he followed in his steps and before long had taken up his first residency in ‘Dimension’, Rosario, a 2000 capacity nightclub. More residencies followed, including Mengano, Metro, Lager and Damasco. On New Year's Eve, 1985, Ariel ended his residency at the nightclub Dimension with a set performance of 17 hours.

Ariel's early musical influences include early new wave music and the disco sounds of Talking Heads, Blondie, Kat Mandu, The Clash, The B-52's, Flash and the Pan, and Gino Soccio, as well as Latin American rumba.

Early 1990s (1991–1996) 

After completing secondary education top of his school Ariel attended Rosario University of Economics, studying for 2 years before making the decision to leave for Europe.

He arrived in Europe in the spring of 1991, more specifically in Ibiza. In a short amount of time he discovered the newly established rave scene, house music and the Balearic Beat and met the Pacha resident DJ Alfredo, also from Rosario. Soon after Ariel played his first European set at club Pacha in Ibiza, this was followed by guest spots in Lola, Es Paradis, including one gig at the recently launched terrace at Space.

As his reputation grew so did the bookings and during 1993, after basing himself in London, he began his residency at Kudos and Crews Bar in the heart of Covent Garden.

Regular sets at Tribal Gathering, The Limelight, Club UK and Heaven together with an arduous touring schedule saw Ariel become a pioneer of the international DJ circuit.

A 1994 performance at Bunker disco club in Buenos Aires can be seen on YouTube.

During these years Ariel was photographed by art designer ‘Trademark’ making him a pin-up on the London scene and adding to his public profile.

While playing at Browns Club in London's Covent Garden in 1994, Ariel met late musician Prince. It's not the first time Ariel DJed for Prince, but on this occasion Prince was the only person on his dancefloor.  Prince had the habit of giving Ariel CDs of his own music to play. The story became so widespread that was featured on an issue of GQ magazine in the UK.

Mid 1990s and the "Freedom Era" (1996–2001) 

In 1996 Ariel decided to try something new, a weekly residency in London where he could play all night instead of two-hour regular guest slots. Very soon he was offered a ten-hour-long set in the second room of London's largest venue, Bagley's Studios in Kings Cross (now renamed Canvas) for the weekly Saturday night named "Freedom". Three months later he moved to the main room, where he performed for 8 hours, from 11pm to 7am playing a fusion of hard house, trance and techno rhythmically inspired by his Latin roots.  For that period, Freedom was one of the busiest Saturday nightclubs in London.

Over the next 5 years (1996–2001) many music magazines and websites started labeling Ariel's 8 hour sets at Bagley's Studios legendary. 
Enhancing the above notion was also a phenomenon observed in many music related virtual communities and internet forums such as Harderfaster.net and Dancemuzik.com which consisted of a sequence of numerous nostalgic posts discussing the night  
and praising it as London's Biggest Clubbing Landmark  along with reunion messages by fans and lovers of the Freedom club and Ariel's 8 hours sets. This Freedom reunion-comeback desire was ignited a few years after the club ceased in 2002. However, as of May 2007, those attempts were unsuccessful.

Keeping in mind London's influence on the musical evolution of the electronic dance music scene, many of the period's crossover tracks exposed on Ariel's dance floor became worldwide hits while being played repeatedly over a long period. Records such as DJ Sandy Vs Housetrap “Overdrive”, Latin Thing “Latin Thing” and Groovezone “Eisbaer” were first heard on Ariel's dance floor.

He was at the forefront of the trance and hard house scene of the nineties. In Friday, 21 August 1998, The Evening Standard newspaper in London ran a 2-page article citing Ariel's “Techno set at Bagley’s” as the main responsible cause of Class A drug consumption in the King's Cross area of London.

In 1997, BBC's Radio 1 DJ Pete Tong described Ariel as the most underrated DJ in the UK. Ariel toured Australia in 2008, playing venues in Sydney, Melbourne, and Perth.

In 1999, Ariel was invited to appear on BBC London for DJ John Peel's 60th birthday celebration; an interview that was broadcast on BBC Knowledge for the UK. John Peel was an early supporter of Ariel's music and played many of his productions on his legendary BBC Radio 1 show.

2000s (2001–2010)

Ariel has been a resident DJ at London's Fabric since its opening in 1999; furthermore it was the first place he showcased his new Latin tech house sound, playing many of his own productions and performing with live instrumentation provided by percussionists and various musicians. An example of this sound is featured on his recent compilation for DTPM Recordings "Sydney Vs London"
Ariel left Fabric on 8 October 2006 after a 7-year long residency (approximately 400 gigs), the longest in his career.

Moreover, Ariel exposed his new style in other London's cutting edge clubs, such as Turnmills. His party "Latinaires" took place once a month, along with the weekly event "The Gallery" for 2 years (2002–2004). In 2004, Ariel launched "Manteca" a weekly Latin music club, at Freedom bar in London's Soho, introducing a wide range of traditional Latin sounds and styles to the London crowds,  such as Rumba, Salsa, Cumbia, Plena and Brazilian Music along with live percussionists.

In May 2000 A9 was featured as Mixmag’s Big Tune of the Month.

In 2005 Ariel began a partnership with young producers Alex Celler and X Green to co-produce further music projects, and in March 2007 he officially launched his digital record label MyDust.

Late 2009, Ariel released his album, "Camará". Although he has released a number of mixed compilations, "Camará" was Ariel's debut as an [artist].

Cuba was the inspiration for Camará. From an early age the country has fascinated Ariel, who shares his home city of Rosario, Argentina with the revolutionary, Ernesto "Che" Guevara. The sensual rhythms of the Afro-Cuban Rumba can be heard, and felt, throughout Camará, the foundations of which were laid when Ariel visited Cuba for the first time. 
Armed with his mini-disc recorder and microphone, Ariel spent weeks hanging out with, and recording, the musicians and street life around the Vedado and Centro neighbourhoods of Havana. These unique recordings provide much of Camará's atmosphere, and live instrumentation from Ariel's fellow Latin expats Oli Savill Da Lata, Guillermo Hill (Negrocan) and Silver City (20:20 Vision) add a further organic dimension, while studio whiz kids Alex Celler and X Green maintain the electronic essence of Ariel's trademark Latin Tech sound.

The album received support from a wide range of producers and Djs alike, including David Guetta, Richie Hawtin and Layo & Bushwacka among others.

From 2010 onwards DJ Ariel continued to be a feature of many successful London club nights, including residencies at Onyx at Area, and the gay club phenomenon that has become Room Service.

Further international appearances in this decade have seen Ariel playing Tel-Aviv, Paris, Amsterdam, and Buenos Aires.

2010s (2010–present)

In 2011, Ariel was featured in London Magazine Out Front as he reflects on the highlights of living in London.

The kentishtowner website published an article, written by journalist Tom Kihl, that went viral in 2014. Top 5 Lost London Nightclubs of the 90s featured former clubs such as Bagley's, Velvet Rooms, The Cross, Turnmills, and The End. The article reflected how beloved these venues still are by people all over London, The UK, and abroad. Ariel's 10 hour set at Bagleys is also mentioned in the article. 

The website Guestlist published an article in 2014 that cited Freedom at Bagley's as one of the five clubs you wish you'd experienced in their heyday. Other clubs include The Haçienda in Manchester and Turnmills in London.

The website Thump Vice published an article in 2014, written by journalist Adam Bychawski, where he reflected on London's gentrification, and its effects on some of Britain's biggest clubs. Ariel contributed and it's featured in the article. 

In 2015, the website djhere published an interview with EDM Dj Producer Michael Woods where he cited DJ Ariel's set at Bagley's as the inspiration that first got him into music production, and his subsequent DJ career. 

In 2016, the Ministry of Sound website published an article titled “Stars of VHS”, evoking DJ Ariel's 8 hour set at Bagley's. In the article you can see live footage of Ariel's set filmed at Bagley's by MTV Europe. 

Photos of DJ Ariel touring nightclubs in the North of England in the early 90s have been included in the book: “Out and About with Linden”, published by Pariah Press in 2022. 

The My London News website published an article in 2022, "Remembering Bagleys", about the history and musical legacy of Bagley's nightclub. Dj Ariel is featured in the article. 

Video footage of DJ Ariel's performance at Bunker nightclub in Buenos Aires, Argentina on 9 October 1994 has been included in the documentary "Comandante Fort" released on Star+ / Disney in February 2023.

Music

Influences
Ariel's distinctive electronic sound, during both the ‘90s and ‘00s, is formed by his knowledge and understanding of World and African rhythms cultivated into his sets. His percussive, Latin based groove is heavily influenced by the dynamics of Rumba Music and the traditional Cuban roots.

Moreover Ariel’s 1990s influences include the Balearic Beat, the early 1990s Hard House sound of labels such as Strictly Rhythm, Touché Records, UMM Records and later on Dutch labels Aspro Records and Work Records. His post-millennium sound is directly influenced by labels such as Mosaic, Camouflage, Mango Boy and Ibadan.

Throughout his  career Ariel was inspired by artists such as George Morel, Todd Terry, DJ HMC, S ‘N’ S, Marmion, Patrick Prins, Silvio Ecomo, Samuel L Sessions and Bear Who.

The Ariel sound

Well known for closing the gay/straight clubbing divide, Ariel doesn’t just play records; he creates a unique atmosphere with them, bringing together different styles of music by accentuating the African and Latin polyrhythm’s that are the trademark of his sound. 
From the beginning Ariel always forged his own path as a DJ. He did not follow any mainstream music current and stayed intact with passing trends. Furthermore, he managed to create his own personal sound by choosing the records he played according to his taste, not with regards to the artist’s or label's popularity and success status.
However, Ariel’s sound has progressed through the last 3 decades beginning as disco and new wave music throughout the '80s, hard house and trance in the '90s and Latin tech house in the '00s.
Ariel DJ sets and track selection are always performed live, guide solely by instinct and consist of various mood changes and techniques aimed to create energy flow and atmosphere on the dance floor.

Music productions

Ariel’s debut single “Deep”, released in 1997, was a hardhouse/trance record, released on Wonderboy Records and entered the number 1 spot on the UK Official Dance Chart straight after its release. Following the success of “Deep”, Ariel had multiple commissions for remixes. Some of these remixes include some trance classics as Marmion “Schöneberg”, Vincent De Moor “Flowtation” Dj Sandy Vs Housetrap “Overdrive”, Storm “Time to Burn”, Lil Louis Vs Josh Wink “French Kiss” and Darude “Sandstorm” which became the biggest selling 12” of 2000.

Meanwhile, Ariel also released a series of more underground records, including “The End EP” and “Icebreaker/Time”; gaining support from djs such as Paul van Dyk and John Digweed. 
In 2000 Ariel released “A9” which went on to become the first UK Top 30 hit by an Argentine artist.(UK Singles Chart #28)

Lately, in March 2007 Ariel started releasing a large number of tracks on his digital label ‘MyDust’. Some of those tracks were made during recent years but were never released.

Club residences
Throughout his career Ariel's has combined his weekly club residencies with international appearances around the world.

Residencies

Guest spots
His music has taken him to more than 40 different countries over the last 15 years, including the whole of Europe and main spots in North America and Asia, playing some of the greatest venues and music festivals around the world. Ariel was also one of the first international DJs to play the Middle East and Asia, visiting other places such as Israel, Turkey, Australia and Ho Chi Minh City in Vietnam.

Ariel headlined the first ever Gay Pride in Africa in 1997 in Johannesburg and was also invited to perform at the Summer Stage in New York City's Central Park the same year. Ariel's 2005/6 Latin American tour saw him play in front of thousands on Rio de Janeiro, Ipanema beach, Buenos Aires and Punta del Este in Uruguay.

Lastly, Ariel is regularly asked to perform at the private parties of Madonna, Prince, and Bon Jovi among others celebrities.

Honors/Achievements
He was the first Argentine artist to enter the UK Top 30 Singles Chart with his record “A9”.

In November 1999, Muzik magazine listed Ariel in their Top 50 best DJs in the world.

He was the first international DJ to be broadcast on Cuban radio, following his 2002 'Dia de la Revolucion' street party in Havana.

In 2004 and 2005 Ariel was honoured by playing two exclusive sets at the Argentine Embassy in London's Belgravia.

During his career, Ariel performed repeatedly for charity events such as HIV Research and London's Big Issue.

Personal life

An advocate of Orthopathy and raw foodism, Ariel has taken time off from music since 2008 to study natural health, and has written and published a succession of books on the topics of natural health and nutrition.

Selected discography
Some selected discography:

Albums
1999: The Sound of Freedom (Automatic Records)
2000: Freedom – 4 Ultimate Years of Clubbing (Wax Records)
2003: Nu Latin Live (Red and Blue)
2005: DTPM - Sydney vs London (DTPM Recordings)
2006: Mandarin (MyDust)
2009: Camará (MyDust)

Singles/EPs
1996: "Deep" (Pilot Recordings)
1997: "Deep (I'm Falling Deeper)" (A&M) - UK #47
1997: The End EP (Pilot)
1997: "Get On Down" (White Label)
1999: "PsychoKiller" (White Label)
1999: "Icebreaker/Time" (Pneumatiq)
2000: "A9" (Automatic Records) - UK #28
2000: "A9" (London)
2000: Ariel Presents: Tools Volume One (A7 Records)
2000: Sampler One - Out Here (A7)
2003: "Central" (Phoenix G)
2005: "Hambre" (Demo)
2007: "Se Miro" (MyDust)
2008: "Vandula" (MyDust)
2008: "Santiago" (MyDust)
2010: "Chevere" (MyDust)
2011: "D'ese" (MyDust)

Remixes
1996: Vincent De Moor - "Flowtation" (XL Recordings)
1997: Kool World - "In-Vader" (Kool World Records)
1997: The Vinyl Frontier - "Vibe to the 7" (Sound Design)
1998: Marmion - "Schöneberg" (FFRR)
2000: Josh Wink & Lil' Louis – "French Kiss" (FFRR)
2000: Angelic - "It's My Turn" (Serious Records)
2000: DJ Sandy vs. Housetrap – "Overdrive" (Positiva)
2000: Darude – "Sandstorm" (Neo Records)
2000: Storm - "Time to Burn" (Data)
2000: DJ Jean - "The Launch" (AM:PM)
2001: Warp Brothers - "Phatt Bass" (Nu Life)
2001: Nigel Gee - "Hootin' Harry" (Neo Records)
2001: Joshua Ryan – "Pistolwhip" (Nu Life)

References

External links
 Ariel on Bandcamp

1967 births
Living people
Club DJs
Argentine emigrants to England
Argentine record producers
Argentine electronic musicians
Musicians from Rosario, Santa Fe